Olena Serhiyivna Kryvytska (born 23 February 1987) is a Ukrainian fencer who has won three world championship bronze medals. She competed at the 2012 Summer Olympics in the Women's épée, and was defeated in the second round.  She was also part of the Ukrainian women's épée team that finished in 8th place.

She originally took up fencing in Ternopil, Ukraine, having moved there from Russia in the early 1990s.

In March 2022, speaking of the 2022 Russian invasion of Ukraine, she said her fellow athletes from Russia: "need to pick a side. Too many are keeping quiet and saying nothing. That's not acceptable, because they're involved; they belong to Russia. If they have a lot of followers on Instagram, they have to speak out and say that they are on the side of peace, and that their president is doing terrible things."

References

External links
 
  (archive)
 
 

Ukrainian female épée fencers
Olympic fencers of Ukraine
Fencers at the 2012 Summer Olympics
Fencers at the 2016 Summer Olympics
Universiade medalists in fencing
People from Rostov
1987 births
Living people
Universiade gold medalists for Ukraine
Universiade silver medalists for Ukraine
Universiade bronze medalists for Ukraine
Medalists at the 2009 Summer Universiade
Medalists at the 2011 Summer Universiade
Medalists at the 2013 Summer Universiade
Fencers at the 2020 Summer Olympics
20th-century Ukrainian women
21st-century Ukrainian women